Shane McNulty (born 28 June 1994) is an Irish hurler who plays for Waterford Senior Championship club De La Salle and at inter-county level with the Waterford senior hurling team. He usually lines out as a left corner-back.

Playing career

CBS Tramore

McNulty first came to prominence as a hurler during his secondary schooling at Tramore CBS. He played in every grade of hurling with the school and enjoyed county championship success in the under-15 grade in March 2008 following a 3-11 to 2-06 defeat of Abbey Community School from Ferrybank.

De La Salle College

McNulty transferred from Tramore CBS to De La Salle College to finish his secondary schooling and immediately established himself on the college's senior hurling team. He lined out in several Harty Cup campaigns with the college.

Waterford Institute of Technology

McNulty completed a Business degree at the Waterford Institute of Technology between and joined the senior hurling team in his second year. He was a regular player in several Fitzgibbon Cup campaigns.

De La Salle

McNulty joined the De La Salle club at a young age and played in all grades at juvenile and underage levels. On 15 December 2013, he lined out at full-back when De La Salle faced St. Carthage's in the Waterford Under-21 Championship final. He ended the game with a winners' medal following the 3-13 to 1-04 victory.

McNulty assumed the captaincy of the De La Salle under-21 team in 2015, however, the championship was delayed for almost a year for a number of reasons. On 20 September 2016, he won a second Waterford Under-21 Championship medal following a 4-20 to 4-16 defeat of Dungarvan in the final.

McNulty made his first appearance for the De La Salle senior team during the 2012 Waterford Senior Championship. On 14 October, he came on as a 34th-minute substitute and scored 0-02 from play when De La Salle defeated Dungarvan by 1-21 to 0-12 to claim the Waterford Senior Championship.

Waterford

Minor and under-21

McNulty first lined out for Waterford as a member of the minor team during the 2011 Munster Championship. He made his first appearance for the team on 27 April when he was introduced as a 48th-minute substitute in a 2-16 to 1-13 defeat of Tipperary. McNulty subsequently broke onto the starting fifteen and was selected at midfield when Waterford faced Clare in the Munster final on 10 July. He ended the game on the losing side following a 1-20 to 3-09 defeat.

McNulty was again eligible for the minor grade in 2012. He played his last game in the minor grade on 29 June when Waterford suffered a 2-25 to 0-12 defeat by Tipperary at the Munster semi-final stage.

On 18 July 2013, McNulty made his first appearance for the Waterford under-21 hurling team. He lined out at centre-back in a 2-15 to 0-17 defeat by Clare in the Munster Championship.

McNulty was again included on the Waterford under-21 team for 2014 Munster Championship. His only appearance that year was at left corner-back in Waterford's 3-18 to 0-16 defeat by Cork on 16 July.

For the third successive season, McNulty was selected for the under-21 team in 2015. He made his last appearance in the grade on 15 July when Waterford suffered a 0-23 to 1-18 defeat by Clare at the semi-final stage.

Senior

McNulty was added to the Waterford senior panel prior to the start of the 2014 National League. He made his first appearance for the team on 9 March 2014 when he lined out at midfield in a 1-13 to 1-10 defeat of Dublin. McNulty remained on the panel and was an unused substitute for the Munster Championship.

On 3 May 2015, McNulty was named amongst the substitutes for the National League final. He remained on the bench for the entire game but collected a winners' medal following the 1-24 to 0-17 defeat of Cork. On 12 July 2015, McNulty was an unused substitute when Waterford were beaten for the fourth time in six seasons by Tipperary in the Munster final.

On 1 May 2016, McNulty was on the bench when Waterford drew 0-22 apiece with Clare in the 2016 National League final. He was also a non-playing substitute for the replay, which Waterford lost by 1-23 to 2-19. On 10 July, McNulty was again a non-playing substitute for the 2016 Munster final, with Waterford eventually losing by 5-19 to 0-13.

McNulty made his championship debut on 8 July 2017 when he came on as a substitute for Noel Connors at right corner-back in a 4-23 to 2-22 defeat of Kilkenny. On 3 September, he was anon-playing substitute when Waterford suffered a 0-26 to 2-17 defeat by Galway in the All-Ireland final.

On 31 March 2019, McNulty was selected at right corner-back when Waterford faced Limerick in the National League final. He ended the game on the losing side following a 1-24 to 0-19 defeat.

Career statistics

Honours

De La Salle
Waterford Senior Hurling Championship (1): 2012
Waterford Under-21 Hurling Championship (2): 2013, 2015

Waterford
National Hurling League (1): 2015

References

]

1994 births
Living people
De La Salle hurlers
Waterford inter-county hurlers
Hurling backs
People educated at De La Salle College Waterford
Alumni of Waterford Institute of Technology
Waterford IT hurlers